The Parque de Fútbol San Juan Bosco is a 1,000-seat association football stadium in San Juan, Puerto Rico. As of the 2018-19 Liga Puerto Rico season, it hosts the home matches of Don Bosco FC.

References

External links
Soccerway profile

Football venues in Puerto Rico